The Boulder Oil Field was an oil field, in the area of Boulder, Colorado.

Some history

Ute Indians were the first to discover oil, in Colorado.

The McKenzie Well still stands, near Boulder, and Isaac Canfield found it in 1901, by dowsing, first producing oil, on February 5, 1902. The McKenzie Well was found, on the ranch or farm, of Neil McKenzie. It is highly unusual, extraordinary, that the original site of the discovery of Boulder Oil Field remained the last producing oil well.

Of note, before the McKenzie Well was found,  Florence oil driller Canfield  noticed Boulder's topographic features resembled those of Florence; in Boulder area there were oil seeps, odors. The McKenzie Well was the first oil well sunk in what is now a vast oil and gas producing area, the Denver-Julesburg basin.

In Fremont County, Colorado, the Florence Oil Field was the first oil field west of the Mississippi River. From 1901, the Boulder Oil Field became the second, and, the Boulder Oil Field was discovered the same year as Spindletop, in Texas.

Locally, close to 200 oil wells have been drilled in Boulder, but barely a trace remains. The area produced about 800,000 barrels of oil, from Cretaceous Pierre Shale, and the oil field's maximum production was in 1909, with 85,000 barrels of oil.

See also

 Denver Basin
 Green River Formation
 Niobrara Formation
 Piceance Basin
 Wattenberg Gas Field

References

External links and references

 One link
 History, in Boulder, Colorado
 A photo

Petroleum production
Oil fields
Oil fields of the United States
Geologic provinces of Colorado